Kevin Tulimieri (born 8 September 1992) is an Italian footballer who plays for Maltese side Valletta.

Career
Tulimieri started his senior career with A.S.D. Gelbison Cilento Vallo della Lucania. In 2013, he signed for S.F. Aversa Normanna in the Italian Serie C, where he made four league appearances and scored one goal. After that, he played for Potenza Calcio, U.S. Savoia 1908, Sporting Fulgor Molfetta, Ħamrun Spartans, and Valletta, where he now plays.

References

External links 
 The world turned upside down in 8 months of Tulimieri: from dishwasher to Malta's MVP to Hamrun 
 the story of kevin tulimieri, from d to c of champions
 Interview with Kevin Tulimieri
 Tulimieri: "I wrote a piece of history of Hamrun, a great German" - EXCLUSIVE EC 
 Tulimieri still tied to his former fans: "in love with them, they deserve Legapro"

Living people
1992 births
Valletta F.C. players
Association football forwards
Association football wingers
Italian expatriate footballers
Ħamrun Spartans F.C. players
Casale F.B.C. players
S.F. Aversa Normanna players
Potenza Calcio players
Italian footballers